Marco Kaffenberger (born 9 July 1996) is a German footballer who plays as a defender for Hessenliga club SV Unter-Flockenbach.

References

1996 births
Living people
People from Bergstraße (district)
Sportspeople from Darmstadt (region)
Footballers from Hesse
German footballers
Association football defenders
Eintracht Braunschweig II players
Stuttgarter Kickers players
SV Werder Bremen II players
3. Liga players
Regionalliga players
Hessenliga players